Flipmode may refer to:

 Flipmode Entertainment, now Conglomerate, a record label founded in 1996 by Busta Rhymes
 "Flipmode" (song), a 2017 song by Fabolous, Chris Brown, and Velous
 "Flipmode" (Space Ghost Coast to Coast), a television episode